Edward Conway, 1st Viscount Conway PC (1564 – 3 January 1631) was an English soldier and statesman. Notable among his descendants are Queen Elizabeth II and Barack Obama.
He was the son and heir of Sir John Conway of Arrow, and his wife Ellen or Eleanor, daughter of Sir Fulke Greville of Beauchamp's Court, Warwickshire.

He commanded a foot regiment at the sack of Cadiz in 1596, where he was knighted.  He then served as governor of Brill, an English Cautionary Town near Rotterdam in the Netherlands, where his daughter Brilliana (who married Robert Harley) was born. In the first parliament held in the reign of James I, he sat as member for Penryn. When Brill was handed back to the States of Holland in 1616, he was given a pension.

He was appointed to the Privy Council in 1622 and made a Secretary of State in January 1623 for five years.  In the parliament which convened on 19 February 1624 he was returned for Evesham. He was created Baron Conway, of Ragley, in 1624 or 1625 and Viscount Conway in 1627, and received the Irish peerage title of Viscount Killultagh.  No doubt as a result of his time in the Netherlands, he was a supporter of a 'Protestant' foreign policy; he was sent as ambassador to Prague.  In 1628, he was appointed Lord President of the Council, a post he held until his death on 3 January 1631.

Family
Conway married firstly Dorothy (died 1613), daughter of Sir John Tracy of Tedington, Gloucestershire, and widow of Edmund Bray. They had three sons and four daughters, including Conway's son and heir Edward.

In 1614 or 1615, he married secondly Katherine (died 1639), daughter of Giles Hueriblock, a merchant from Ghent, and widow of John West (died 1612) and Richard Fust (died 1613), both of the London Grocers' Company. She was an extensive investor in New World ventures including the Virginia Company. The second Lady Conway left various bequests for education and relief of poverty. She is buried in St Mary's Church, Acton.

Notes

References
  
Attribution
 

|-

|-

1564 births
1631 deaths
Secretaries of State of the Kingdom of England
Lord-Lieutenants of Hampshire
Lord Presidents of the Council
Voorne aan Zee
Members of the pre-1707 English Parliament for constituencies in Cornwall
Members of the Privy Council of England
16th-century English nobility
Peers of England created by James I
People from Warwickshire
16th-century English soldiers
English MPs 1604–1611
English MPs 1624–1625
Viscounts Conway
Viscounts in the Peerage of Ireland
Peers of Ireland created by Charles I